Helm may refer to:

Common meanings
 a ship's steering mechanism; see tiller and ship's wheel
 another term for helmsman
 an archaic term for a helmet, used as armor

Arts and entertainment

 Matt Helm, a character created by Donald Hamilton
 Helm (Forgotten Realms), a god in the Forgotten Realms campaign setting for the game Dungeons & Dragons 
 Helm, a character from the 2000AD comic strip Rogue Trooper
 Helm (album), released by Lebanese singer Carole Samaha
 Helm, a novel by Steven Gould

HELM 
 Hierarchical editing language for macromolecules, a method of describing complex biological molecules
 Holomorphic embedding load flow method, a mathematical technique for solving AC power flow

People
 Helm (given name)
 Helm (surname)

Places

United States
 Helm, California, an unincorporated community
 Helm, Kentucky, an unincorporated community
 Helm, Missouri, an unincorporated community
 Helm Canal, California, an aqueduct

Antarctica
 Helm Glacier
 Helm Peak
 Helm Point

Elsewhere
 Helm Crag, Cumbria, England
 Helm (mountain), South Tyrol, Italy

Other uses
 Helm Bank, a Colombian commercial bank purchased and rebranded by Itaú Unibanco
 , a multinational chemicals marketing and distribution company headquartered in Hamburg, Germany
 Helm Wind, which blows in Cumbria, England
 Helmet (heraldry) or helm
 Quarter florin, a medieval English coin known as a helm
 , a United States Navy destroyer
 Helm (software), an open source Linux package manager

See also
Helms (disambiguation)
Helme (disambiguation)